Freaky Friday is an American musical television film that premiered as a Disney Channel Original Movie on August 10, 2018. Based on the 1972 book of the same name by Mary Rodgers and the 2016 Disney Theatrical Productions stage adaptation by Bridget Carpenter; the movie is the fourth feature film installment in the Freaky Friday franchise. The adaptation stars Cozi Zuehlsdorff and Heidi Blickenstaff.

Plot 

The film starts off with Ellie and her two friends, Karl and Monica, discussing participating in a big activity with their classmates called "the Hunt", an annual school-wide scavenger hunt. Ellie's brother Fletcher comes in and does a magic trick, but she is unimpressed and tells him to get out. Fletcher, insulted, then steals an hourglass that Ellie's late father had given to her, thereby upsetting his sister.

Meanwhile, her mom Katherine Blake is preparing for her impending wedding to her fiancé Mike. To add to her stress, she is also organizing and catering the wedding. She and Katherine fight and Katherine wishes that Ellie would take more responsibility for herself, while Ellie wishes her mother would understand what it is like to be her. When they start eating breakfast, Ellie asks her mother if she can go to the Hunt, but her mother says no because it scares her. Fletcher's pet bunny goes missing and Mike says he will help find the bunny, Ellie snaps at Mike and says that he is not their dad. Katherine demands that Ellie apologize, but Ellie refuses to apologize. Katherine asks Mike to take Fletcher to school, and Ellie storms to her room.

When Katherine follows Ellie to her room they fight over the hourglass and switch bodies, frightening them. They realize that Ellie's hourglass switched them and must find the identical hourglass given to Katherine, but realize that Katherine sold hers and they must find it. Katherine goes to Ellie's school and Ellie stays at the house. When Katherine arrives at Ellie's school, Savannah, a mean girl, bullies her and says that she will win the Hunt, which worries her. Ellie's crush Adam comes to Katherine and asks her for her lunch, which confuses Katherine but she gives it to him anyway. He tells her if she is going to the hunt which she asks why nobody cares about their grades but then says why the Hunt is a big deal which he says he wants to live up to his brother and wants to bring people together which Katherine thinks is very mature and goes off to class.

When Katherine goes to class she tells Karl and Monica that she won’t be going to the hunt, which surprises them. Ellie then goes to the Venue. When Ellie and Mike do their dance it goes awry and Ellie destroys the cake which upsets her helper Torrey. Back at Ellie's school Savannah keeps bullying Katherine and dumps her tea on her, and when Katherine goes to the restroom to clean up the tea she realizes that Ellie's been keeping a belly button piercing from her, which upsets her a lot. When Ellie and Katherine go to Ellie's parent-teacher conference the principal tells them that when Ellie gets bored she skips class for eleven days, which makes Ellie and Katherine both upset. Katherine starts talking about why that's been happening which is about her dad which makes Ellie upset. Then Katherine reveals the piercing which she tells her that she is grounded.

Ellie then goes to the hourglass store with Fletcher but realizes it's out of business. Then she realizes that if the hourglass is on the hunt then she can go get it. Ellie then asks Katherine to ask Adam to put the hourglass on the hunt which she agrees and tells him but he says no because he is the list master which causes her to say it is a childish game which makes him upset. To make matters worse Karl and Monica come over and say that she has been acting super weird today and says she is focused on the hourglass which makes them upset.

Katherine takes Fletcher on a walk and tells him that parents lie and he will never go to Vegas. He becomes upset and runs away. At the rehearsal a lot of things go wrong, with Torrey quitting, Karl and Monica deciding to ditch "Ellie", and she tells Mike she's rethinking the wedding, which upsets Katherine. Katherine, Ellie and Mike realize Fletcher has gone missing and go find him. Adam finds Fletcher and convinces him to return home. Adam then says that he might consider putting the hourglass on the list.

Ellie begs Karl and Monica to put "Ellie" back on the team, which they agree to. Katherine says Ellie should do the hunt, but because of their switch, Katherine says she should do it. Off the Isle, the magazine that was going to feature Katherine's wedding, decides not to but Ellie convinces them to cover the wedding.

Ellie then tells Mike she is not mad at him and loves him, and decides to treat Fletcher better. Katherine obtains the hourglass in a fight with Savannah and wins the hunt. She then goes to the wedding and is supposed to switch bodies with Ellie but it does not work. The wedding starts, but she stops it and declares how much she loves Katherine, which causes them to switch back and they reconcile. The wedding resumes and everyone dances at the reception.

Cast 
 Cozi Zuehlsdorff as Ellie Blake
 Heidi Blickenstaff as Katherine Blake
 Jason Maybaum as Fletcher Blake
 Alex Désert as Mike Harper
 Ricky He as Adam 
 Kahyun Kim as Torrey Min
 Dara Renee as Savannah
 Isaiah Lehtinen as Karl Carlson
 Jennifer Laporte as Monica Yang
 Sarah Willey as Kitty
 Rukiya Bernard as Danielle the Journalist
 Joshua Pak as Luis the Photographer
 Lauren McGibbon as Ms. Meyers
 Dave Hurtubise as Mr. Blumen
 Gary Jones as Principal Ehrin
 Paula Burrows as Mrs. Luckenbill
 Jag Arneja as Señor O'Brien

Production 
The film is based on the novel Freaky Friday by Mary Rodgers, and Disney's stage adaptation of the novel. Heidi Blickenstaff reprises her role as the mother, Katherine Blake, from the stage version, and Cozi Zuehlsdorff plays the daughter, Ellie Blake. Steve Carr serves as director and executive producer, Bridget Carpenter serves as screenwriter, Tom Kitt and Brian Yorkey serve as composers, Susan Cartsonis and Thomas Schumacher serve as executive producers, and John Carrafa serves as choreographer. The film premiered on Disney Channel on August 10, 2018.

Reception

Critical response 
IndieWire rated the movie A−, stating, "In the case of Disney Channel’s latest adaptation, dusting off “Freaky Friday” to reimagine it as a full-blown, Broadway-inflected musical is more than worth the effort thanks to its talented cast, infectious songs, and lively musical numbers." Common Sense Media rated the movie 4 stars out of 5, indicating, "Musical reboot's heartwarming themes are great for families."

Ratings 
During its premiere in the 8:00 PM time slot, Freaky Friday attracted a total of 1.58 million viewers with a 0.29 rating for people aged 18–49, making it the lowest-rated Disney Channel Original Movie premiere of the last decade, until the premiere of Kim Possible in 2019. Over the course of seven telecasts during the first three days of airing, the film attracted a total of 7.2 million viewers, including 3.1 million among kids 6–14.

References

External links 
 

2010s musical films
2018 films
2018 television films
American musical television films
Disney Channel Original Movie films
Disney film remakes
Films based on adaptations
Films based on American novels
Films based on musicals
Films directed by Steve Carr
Musical film remakes
Films shot in British Columbia
Freaky Friday
Television remakes of films
Films about mother–daughter relationships
2010s English-language films
2010s American films